Presidential elections were held in El Salvador on 2 February 2014, with a second round held on 9 March since no candidate won an outright majority. The primary candidates were Vice-President Salvador Sánchez Cerén of the FMLN, San Salvador Mayor Norman Quijano of ARENA, and Former President Antonio "Tony" Saca. Saca represented GANA, the National Conciliation Party, and the Christian Democratic Party in the UNIDAD coalition. Incumbent President Mauricio Funes was ineligible to run for a consecutive second term. Sánchez Cerén and Quijano emerged as the contestants in the runoff held on 9 March in which Sánchez Cerén was declared the victor.

Background
On 22 October 2012, the Supreme Electoral Tribune increased the total number of voting centers and assigned eligible voters to the voting center closest to their address. Previously, eligible voters were assigned to municipal voting centers alphabetically, forcing some to travel longer distances to vote. The 2014 presidential election will be the first election to follow such rules.

On 24 January 2013, the Legislative Assembly passed legislation to allow Salvadorans living abroad to vote in all future elections. 92% of Salvadorans living abroad are based in the United States and Canada. According to the Supreme Electoral Tribune, there are 200,000 Salvadorans living internationally who are eligible to vote. The FMLN's presidential candidate Salvador Sanchez Cerén visited southern California to meet with Salvadoran Americans and tour their communities in August 2013.

In regards to the high crime rate, there has been a two-year-old truce between the Mara Salvatrucha (MS-13) and Barrio 18 gangs that has halved the murder rate. Likewise, the 2012 Salvadoran legislative and local elections resulted in a strong showing for the opposition ARENA party due to the rising crime rates.

Candidates
The FMLN fielded former rebel during the civil war, Salvador Sánchez Cerén as the party's candidate. ARENA fielded Norman Quijano as its candidate. UNITY fielded former president Antonio Saca with an announcement in February 2013 that had the backing of the Christian Democratic Party, and the National Conciliation Party.

Legal recourse
On 31 July 2013, a professor from the National University of El Salvador presented an argument to the Supreme Court on the constitutionality of a former president's candidacy. The legal language regarding second terms is unclear as the constitution prohibits two consecutive terms, but has been described as "murky" on plural non-consecutive terms. Saca claimed that this was an attempt for the FMLN and ARENA to exclude him from the presidential election. On 6 September, the Constitutional Chamber of the Supreme Court ruled that only party flags, not candidates faces, will appear on the ballot in the presidential election. Saca, as a former president, was widely recognized by Salvadorans, but his Unity coalition was not. He provided polling evidence to back his claim. Due to the court ruling, Unity proposed putting Saca's face on their party flag.

Campaign
Quijano said that he would deploy the army to fight street gangs amidst elevated crime in El Salvador. Sanchez Ceren, on the other hand, said he would forge a political pact in order to pass reforms through a divided Congress that would tackle crime and anemic economic growth. He further said that he would tackle tax evasion and loopholes while also introducing tax incentives for investment in such industries as energy, renovating San Salvador's Comalapa International Airport and improve port facilities. He also said that he would seek to join Petrocaribe.

FMLN
Sánchez Cerén and Ortíz have stated that the "three pillars" of their program is employment, security, and education. In developing this program, the candidates received proposals from representatives of various sectors of society. They have argued that to achieve higher levels of employment these requires expanding public-private partnerships, sponsoring a public development bank, and promoting important industries. In regards to education, the candidates have promised more free food for children in school, a policy of "one child, one computer," and bilingual education. Sánchez Cerén has announced plans for the nation's first "digital university" and increased transportation funding around universities. To address the problems of crime and security, the candidates have proposed increasing funding for new police technologies, promoting campaigns against drug abuse, creating education rehabilitation centers for those convicted of minor offenses and drug crimes, and training community peace officers.

Sánchez Cerén was invited as a closing speaker to the FMLN's "Winter Cultural Dialogues," in which he expressed solidarity with the Bolivarian Alliance for the Americas. He expressed a desire for an alternative development models, such as the types seen in nations with left-wing governments in South America. The notion of "buen vivir," or "living well," was prominent in his political discussion. He said, "Living Well is a current of ideas, of values, of social proposals and policies that runs through Latin America, that tells us it is possible to live in a society governed by equality and fraternity." He stated he would have the nation join Petrocaribe, a multi-national oil alliance that purchases oil from Venezuela, which would allow the nation to buy oil at 60% its current costs, thus freeing up to $640 million to fund social investments proposals.

Sánchez Cerén has proposed the creation of a Ministry of Women. He has stated a plan for more maternity hospitals, domestic violence shelters, and expanding the Centros Ciudad Mujer, translated as "City of Women Centers," which provides services and healthcare to women.

ARENA
Quijano has primarily focused on reforming the economy for higher employment and stronger economic growth. He proposes to encourage the financing of small businesses and to help them make stronger returns. He wants legal reforms in the labor market to provide more mobility and flexibility for youth. Also, he has promoted laws for equal pay for women. He desires to see the government invest through public-private partnerships in building ports, airports, irrigation systems, railways, and highways to encourage intranational and international. He has proposed reforming the Ministry of Agriculture to provide more funding to farmers, help establish new farming technologies, facilitating the marketing of their products on the global market, and create a "true agro-export industry.

UNITY
On 14 October, UNITY presidential candidate Antonio Saca selected former ARENA politician Francisco “Pancho” Laínez, who defected from ARENA in March. He served as Minister of Foreign Relations under President Saca. Saca praised Laínez's record in foreign political and economic relations.
Saca announced that as president he would intend to cut "red tape" for international investment through cutting cumbersome paperwork. He has stated that his policies will create employment for young people in the private sector. He has proposed continuing social investments in healthcare begun under the FMLN, such as the Centros Ciudad Mujer. He states his administration will support Salvadorans abroad and will fight for immigration reform in the United States. Part of his platform includes developing a Vice Ministry of Livestock within the Ministry of Agriculture, aiming to support the dairy and livestock industries. He has promoted a program called "Semilla Mejorada," or "Improved Seed", which would decrease regulations regarding pesticides, insecticides, and would finance the introduction of newer agricultural equipment. Also, he had discussed founding a "land bank" to provide credit to farmers. Despite his efforts to go back to power, on 2 February the candidate came third with only 11.4% of the votes and was not able to continue the presidential race on the second round.

Debates
On 12 January, Quijano, Sánchez Cerén, Saca, Óscar Lemus of the Salvadoran Patriot Fraternity and René Rodriguez Hurtado of the Salvadoran Progressive Party had their first debate ahead of the presidential election. The debate was moderated by Mexican journalist Armando Guzmán of Univision. Observers were critical of the debate. Roberto Rubio of El Salvador’s National Foundation for Development said: “It wasn’t really a debate. In a debate, there’s confrontation between ideas, and argument against argument." President Mauricio Funes even described the debate as "more of the same."

Opinion polls

First round

Second round

Other scenarios

The following polls display run-off scenarios that include Antonio Saca, who did not qualify for the second round.

Quijano vs. Saca

Sánchez Cerén vs. Saca

Conduct
ARENA and FMLN supporters briefly scuffled on voting day. Security was tightened on the day as about 4.9 million voters were eligible to cast their ballots. Sanchez Ceren said that he was "open to the participation of different sectors" and would seek to reach out to others to create "a grand national accord;" Quijano, who voted at a centre set-up at a school in western San Salvador, praising the "peaceful elections;" and Saca said that he was "optimistic" while voting. In the early hours of the day, supporters of each party set up stands with their party's colours across San Salvador and helped voters find their polling centres.

Results

By department

First round

Second round

Reactions
After voting ended in the first round, Sanchez Ceren said: "We won the first round ... we are sure that in the second round we will win by more than 10 points. We are going to work in the coming days to further unite," he added. "We are going to build new understandings, new alliances" and "more than ever we need a new national accord, so that we do not have partisan policies but policies that are backed by all the people of El Salvador." He also attended a mass earlier on the day at the chapel where Archbishop Óscar Romero was assassinated prior to the Salvadoran Civil War. Universidad Centroamericana estimated that Saca's supporters were likely to vote for Quijano in the run-off, but about 25 percent would support Sanchez Ceren and thus enable him to win the presidency.

References

Salvadoran presidential election
Presidential election
2014
Salvadoran presidential election
Salvadoran presidential election